is a railway station on the Hakushin Line in Kita-ku, Niigata, Japan, operated by East Japan Railway Company (JR East).

Lines

Station layout

The station consists of a side platform (1) and an island platform (2/3) serving three tracks, with the station situated above the tracks. The station has a "Midori no Madoguchi" staffed ticket office.

Platforms

Platform 3 is predominantly used for local Hakushin Line services terminating at this station.

History

It was renamed Toyosaka Station on 1 April 1976. With the privatization of JNR on 1 April 1987, the station came under the control of JR East.

From 22 March 1997, some limited express Inaho services began stopping at Toyosaka. A new station building opened on 25 March 2006.

Passenger statistics
In fiscal 2017, the station was used by an average of 3,681 passengers daily (boarding passengers only).

Surrounding area
Toyosaka Post Office
Kita-ku Ward Office
Fukushimagata Lagoon Park

See also
 List of railway stations in Japan

References

External links

 JR East station information page 

Railway stations in Niigata (city)
Stations of East Japan Railway Company
Railway stations in Japan opened in 1952
Hakushin Line